Betül is a Turkish given name of Arabic origin for women. Notable people with the name include:

 Betül Kahraman (born 1995), Turkish ice hockey player
 Betül Mardin (born 1926), Turkish public relations specialist
 Betül Nur Yılmaz, Turkish football referee
 Betül Taygar (born 1997), Turkish ice hockey player
 Betül Cemre Yıldız (born 1989), Turkish chess player
 Betül Yılmaz (born 1988), Turkish handball player
 Meryem Betül Çavdar, Turkish Para Taekwondo practitioner

References 

Turkish feminine given names